Burney is a surname. Notable people with the surname include:

Ansar Burney (born 1956), Pakistani-Arab human rights activist
Cecil Burney (1858–1929), British admiral
Charles Burney (disambiguation), several people
Christopher Burney (1917–1980), British spy during World War II
Clarence A. Burney (1876–1933), Justice of the Supreme Court of Missouri 
Dennistoun Burney (1888–1968), British engineer and inventor
Edward Francis Burney (1760–1848), English artist and illustrator
Frances Burney (1752–1840), English novelist and diarist
Henry Burney (1792–1845), British agent, ambassador of the East India Company
James Burney (1750–1821), British admiral
 Linda Burney (born 1957), Australian politician 
Sarah Burney (1772–1844), novelist, known as S.H. Burney
S. M. H. Burney (Sayed Muzaffar Hussain Burney, 1923–2014), Indian civil servant
Venetia Burney (1918–2009), namer of the dwarf planet Pluto

English-language surnames